Flesh Eaters, also known as Disintegration Nation after the title of its opening track, is the four-song debut EP by American rock band the Flesh Eaters.

Background
At the beginning of 1978, just a few months after being formed, the Flesh Eaters, in an early lineup composed of their founder, the singer and songwriter Chris Desjardins 
(pka Chris D.), guitarist Tito Larriva, bassist John Richey, and drummer Joe Nanini, went into a studio for their first time, with Randy Stodola of the Alley Cats as producer and engineer, to record early versions of the songs "Disintegration Nation", "Agony Shorthand", and "Twisted Road", which, as they were supposed to be demos only, remained unreleased until 2004, when they were featured as bonus tracks on the CD reissue of No Questions Asked, the band's first full-length album originally released in 1980.

Shortly after, still in 1978, Chris D. would come back to Stodola's studio for a second session, this time backed by the members of the pioneering punk rock band the Flyboys, to record what would be the debut release of his band.

Production and release
The Flesh Eaters EP, produced and engineered by Randy Stodola at Alleycat House, his four-track home studio, was released in 1978 on Upsetter Records, in 7-inch vinyl disc format.

Critical reception
In his biography of the Flesh Eaters for Perfect Sound Forever, Jay Hinman said that:

Trouser Press, for its part, commented:

Disintegration Nation EP

Disintegration Nation is an archival 7-inch EP featuring, for the first time on vinyl, and as a stand-alone release, the first studio recordings by the Flesh Eaters. It consists of demo versions of the songs "Disintegration Nation", "Agony Shorthand", and "Twisted Road", recorded at the beginning of 1978, just a few months after the band was formed, at the four-track home studio of Randy Stodola, who produced and engineered the session, with Chris D. on vocals, Tito Larriva on guitar, John Richey on Bass, and Joe Nanini on drums. The three songs would be re-recorded soon after, with revamped lineup, for the band's 1978 self-titled debut EP.

The Flesh Eaters's first ever studio session was first released in 2004, as bonus tracks, on the CD reissue of No Questions Asked, the band's 1980 first studio album.

The Disintegration Nation EP was released on July 15, 2011, on TKO Records, as a limited edition of 500 copies, featuring cover art by Chris D.

Track listing

Reissues
In 1979, a remixed version of "Disintegration Nation" was featured, retitled as "Version Nation", on the Tooth and Nail compilation album.

In 1989, the Flesh Eaters EP was repressed featuring yellow disc labels instead of the original in white.

In 2004, the EP, in its entirety, was included as bonus tracks, on the Atavistic Records' remastered CD reissue of the band's first studio album, No Questions Asked, originally released in 1980 on Upsetter.

Track listing

Personnel
The Flesh Eaters
 Chris Desjardins (aka Chris D.) – vocals
 John Curry – guitar
 Scott Lasken – bass
 Dennis Walsh – drums

Production
 Randy Stodola – co-production, engineering
 Flesheaters – co-production
 Chris Desjardins (credited as CD) – graphic design (front cover), photography (inner sleeve)
 Judith Bell – graphic design (disc labels), typography
 G Hitler – graphic design (disc labels), typography
 Richard Paulsen – illustration (back cover collage)
 Bonnie Ballistic – illustration (back cover drawing)
 J. Jennik – photography (inner sleeve)
 John Curry – photography (inner sleeve)

Notes

References

External links

Reviews
 Hinman, Jay (January, 2001). "The Flesh Eaters: Heavy Punk Thunder from the Lake of Burning Fire". Perfect Sound Forever. Archived from the original on April 20, 2001.
 Young, Jon; Sprague, David. "Flesh Eaters". Trouser Press.
 Jelly, Kames (July 27, 2009). "L.A. Punk Vol. 3- The Flesh Eaters". New Jersey Noise.

Images
 The Flesh Eaters, cover art. Record Collectors of the World Unite.
 Flesh Eaters, 1978 7-inch EP release cover art. Discogs.

Databases
 Flesh Eaters. Discogs.
 Flesh Eaters. Rate Your Music.
 Flesh Eaters. Punky Gibbon.
 Disintegration Nation. Discogs.
 Disintegration Nation. Rate Your Music.
 Disintegration Nation. Punky Gibbon.

1978 debut EPs
The Flesh Eaters albums